Cesare Brandi (Siena, 8 April 1906 – Vignano, 19 January 1988) was an art critic and historian, specialist in conservation-restoration theory.

In 1939 he became the first director of the Istituto Centrale per il Restauro (Central Institute for Restoration, now the Istituto Superiore per la Conservazione ed il Restauro) in Rome.

His main books on art interpretation are Le due vie (1966, Bari), and Teoria generale della critica (1974). Le due vie was presented and debated in Rome by Roland Barthes, Giulio Carlo Argan and Emilio Garroni. The philosopher he felt mostly closer to was Heidegger, although their positions didn't coincide; for this, he felt also closer to Derrida, particularly to his theorization of Différance.

His broad practical experience and his phenomenological references ranging from Plato to Kant, passing through Benedetto Croce, Martin Heidegger, Jean-Paul Sartre, Bergson and especially Edmund Husserl and Hegel, culminated in what became known as Theory of Critical Restoration. In 1963 Brandi published his theories in the book Teoria del Restauro (Theory of Restoration), a landmark theoretical essay on restoration. His theory gave rise to 'trateggio,' a controversial technique for repainting missing or damaged sections of works of art.

Brandi's proposals had a great influence in the Italian Restoration Letter of 1972 and, consequently, in the current practice of restoration around the world.

Life 
He was Born in Siena in Via di Città, graduated in Literature from University of Florence in 1928 . In 1930 Brandi was commissioned by the Superintendence of Monuments and Galleries of Siena to rearrange, catalog and arrange the collection of paintings of the Academy of Fine Arts of the Tuscan city in the new headquarters of Palazzo Buonsignori.

In 1932 he dedicated his first contemporary art essay to Filippo de Pisis after visiting the artist's Parisian studio. In 1933, having won the competition for Inspector in the roles of the Administration of Antiquities and Fine Arts, he passed to the Superintendency of Monuments in Bologna.The assignment lasted about three years; during this period he spent in the city he took care of organizing a first restoration workshop and the "Exhibition of Riminese Painting of the Fourteenth Century" (1935).

In 1936 he assumed inspection functions at the Antiquities and Fine Arts Department and was subsequently appointed Superintendent of Udine Studies from where he was transferred with mixed responsibilities of superintendency and Superintendency in the Governorate of the Italian Aegean islands. In 1938 he was recalled to the Ministry of National Education in Rome and, on the proposal of Giulio Carlo Argan he was assigned in 1939 the task of directing the Royal Central Institute of Restoration

For his work as a critic, Cesare Brandi has twice obtained the Feltrinelli Prize , conferred by the Accademia dei Lincei : in 1958 and in 1980.

References

External links
 ‘Cesare Brandi’, arthistorians.info

1906 births
1988 deaths
Italian art historians
Italian art critics
Italian essayists
Conservator-restorers
20th-century Italian historians
Male essayists
20th-century essayists
20th-century Italian male writers
Italian male non-fiction writers